Meena Kumari (1 August 1933 — 31 March 1972) was an Indian actress, playback singer, poet and costume designer who predominantly worked in Indian cinema between 1939—72. Meena Kumari started her film career with Leatherface, a 1939 film with the name Baby Mahjabeen. For around six years, Baby Meena (as she was called in her later films), continued  to appear as a child artist in a string of films before making her debut with Bachchon Ka Khel as Meena Kumari. However, it was the film Baiju Bawra (1952) which turned  Kumari into an overnight star and Parineeta (1953) which further solidified  her position as a bankable leading lady.
For sometime, particularly till the late 1950s, Kumari continued to show off her versatility as an artist, featuring in films ranging from drama to fantasy and even comedy before adopting the genre which earned  her the sobriquet— Queen of Tragedy.

From late 1950s to early 1960s, Meena Kumari started to appear in films which usually revolved around the trials and tribulations of women of India of that time. Some of her popular films include Dil Apna Aur Preet Parai (1960), in which she actually played the part of "the other woman", Sahib Bibi Aur Ghulam - an alcoholic wife desperate for her husband's attention, Aarti, Main Chup Rahungi (all 1962), Dil Ek Mandir (1963) and Kaajal (1965).

By late 1960s, Meena Kumari got addicted to alcohol, the effect of which was visible in her subsequent films. Some of her last successful films include  Phool Aur Patthar (1966), Mere Apne (1971) and Pakeezah (1972) which went on to become her swan song. Soon after the release of Pakeezah, Meena Kumari breathed her last on 31 March 1972.

In addition to being  an accomplished  actress, Kumari  was also a poet and a playback singer. She sang in some of her early  films  as a child artist and to her poems which came out in an album, I Write, I Recite (1971). Meena Kumari also designed  the costumes  in her final landmark film Pakeezah. In her career of 33 years she appeared in 93 films, an advertisement, a radio programme, and a documentary.

Filmography
The following is the complete filmography of actress Meena Kumari.

As actor

As playback singer

As Costume Designer

Miscellaneous

References

External links

Meena Kumari at Manas: Culture of India
Collection of verses by Meena Kumari

Indian filmographies
Actress filmographies